Swing Wedding is a 1937 MGM Happy Harmonies cartoon directed by Hugh Harman.

A "sequel" to the 1936 short The Old Mill Pond, the cartoon portrays a wedding celebrated by a group of frogs in a swamp. The frogs are designed as caricatures of various African American celebrities of the 1930s, such as Ethel Waters, Stepin Fetchit, Louis Armstrong, Cab Calloway, Fats Waller and the Mills Brothers.

Though hailed as "'one of the finest one-reelers in all of animation" by some commentators, others have derided the use of Zip Coon-type figures and stereotypical dialogue (including expressions such as "Who dat?" and "Yowza!"). The film also contains a controversial scene in which a frog musician uses his trumpet valve as a syringe. The scene plays on the stereotype of black jazz musicians using drugs before performing.

This cartoon was re-released in a shorter version called "Hot Frogs" in 1942 as a “soundies” format.

Plot

Reception
National Exhibitor (March 20, 1937): "The frogs put on a wedding to hot music. Caricatures are made of Negro mannerisms. There appear characters very much like Stepin Fetchit, Bill Robinson, Cab Calloway, Fats Waller. This isn't up to the previous efforts from the Harman-Ising bunch."

Boxoffice (Apr 10, 1937): "Against a background of riotous color, Harman-Ising studios have executed a clever satire on the current craze for swing music which is certain to add a bright note to any program. Such famous sepia stars as Cab Calloway a famous American jazz singer, dancer, bandleader and actor, "Fats" Waller a Pianist and Bill Robinson who was a famous tap dancer during the first half of the 20th century these African American musicians and dancers are caricatured as frogs and the resemblance to the millpond denizens is astounding. The musical accompaniment to the gay frog-pond wedding ceremony is delightfully swinging, although the basic tunes are easily recognizable. A distinctly novel color cartoon."

Selected Motion Pictures (May 1, 1937): "A colorful fantasy of the wedding of two frogs. Fine musical syncopation. Amusing though noisy entertainment."

References

External links
Swing Wedding at the Internet Movie Database.
Swing Wedding Video on DailyMotion
 on Vimeo

1937 films
1937 animated films
1937 short films
1930s American animated films
1930s animated short films
Metro-Goldwyn-Mayer animated short films
Films directed by Hugh Harman
Happy Harmonies
Films about weddings
Films about frogs